Vacuum permittivity, commonly denoted  (pronounced "epsilon nought" or "epsilon zero"), is the value of the absolute dielectric permittivity of classical vacuum. It may also be referred to as the permittivity of free space, the electric constant, or the distributed capacitance of the vacuum. It is an ideal (baseline) physical constant. Its CODATA value is:

 (farads per meter), with a relative uncertainty of 

It is a measure of how dense of an electric field is "permitted" to form in response to electric charges, and relates the units for electric charge to mechanical quantities such as length and force. For example, the force between two separated electric charges with spherical symmetry (in the vacuum of classical electromagnetism) is given by Coulomb's law:

Here, q1 and q2 are the charges, r is the distance between their centres, and the value of the constant fraction  (known as the Coulomb constant, ke) is approximately 9 × 109 N⋅m2⋅C−2. Likewise, ε0 appears in Maxwell's equations, which describe the properties of electric and magnetic fields and electromagnetic radiation, and relate them to their sources. In electrical engineering, ε0 itself is used as a unit to quantify the permittivity of various dielectric materials.

Value
The value of ε0 is defined by the formula

where c is the defined value for the speed of light in classical vacuum in SI units, and μ0 is the parameter that international Standards Organizations call the "magnetic constant" (commonly called vacuum permeability or the permeability of free space). Since μ0 has an approximate value 4π × 10−7 H/m, and c has the defined value  m⋅s−1, it follows that ε0 can be expressed numerically as

(or A2⋅s4⋅kg−1⋅m−3 in SI base units, or C2⋅N−1⋅m−2 or C⋅V−1⋅m−1 using other SI coherent units).

The historical origins of the electric constant ε0, and its value, are explained in more detail below.

Redefinition of the SI units

The ampere was redefined by defining the elementary charge as an exact number of coulombs as from 20 May 2019, with the effect that the vacuum electric permittivity no longer has an exactly determined value in SI units. The value of the electron charge became a numerically defined quantity, not measured, making μ0 a measured quantity. Consequently, ε0  is not exact. As before, it is defined by the equation , and is thus determined by the value of μ0, the magnetic vacuum permeability which in turn is determined by the experimentally determined dimensionless fine-structure constant α:

with e being the elementary charge, h being the Planck constant, and c being the speed of light in vacuum, each with exactly defined values. The relative uncertainty in the value of ε0 is therefore the same as that for the dimensionless fine-structure constant, namely

Terminology
Historically, the parameter ε0 has been known by many different names. The terms "vacuum permittivity" or its variants, such as  "permittivity in/of vacuum", "permittivity of empty space", or "permittivity of free space" are widespread. Standards Organizations worldwide now use "electric constant" as a uniform term for this quantity, and official standards documents have adopted the term (although they continue to list the older terms as synonyms).

Another historical synonym was "dielectric constant of vacuum", as "dielectric constant" was sometimes used in the past for the absolute permittivity.  However, in modern usage "dielectric constant" typically refers exclusively to a relative permittivity ε/ε0 and even this usage is considered "obsolete" by some standards bodies in favor of relative static permittivity. Hence, the term "dielectric constant of vacuum"  for the electric constant ε0 is considered obsolete by most modern authors, although occasional examples of continuing usage can be found.

Historical origin of the parameter ε0
As indicated above, the parameter ε0 is a measurement-system constant. Its presence in the equations now used to define electromagnetic quantities is the result of the so-called "rationalization" process described below. But the method of allocating a value to it is a consequence of the result that Maxwell's equations predict that, in free space, electromagnetic waves move with the speed of light.  Understanding why ε0 has the value it does requires a brief understanding of the history.

Rationalization of units
The experiments of Coulomb and others showed that the force F between two equal point-like "amounts" of electricity, situated a distance r apart in free space, should be given by a formula that has the form

where Q is a quantity that represents the amount of electricity present at each of the two points, and ke is the Coulomb constant. If one is starting with no constraints, then the value of ke may be chosen arbitrarily. For each different choice of ke there is a different "interpretation" of Q: to avoid confusion, each different "interpretation" has to be allocated a distinctive name and symbol.

In one of the systems of equations and units agreed in the late 19th century, called the "centimeter–gram–second electrostatic system of units" (the cgs esu system), the constant ke was taken equal to 1, and a quantity now called "Gaussian electric charge" qs was defined by the resulting equation

The unit of Gaussian charge, the statcoulomb, is such that two units, a distance of 1 centimeter apart, repel each other with a force equal to the cgs unit of force, the dyne. Thus, the unit of Gaussian charge can also be written 1 dyne1/2 cm. "Gaussian electric charge" is not the same mathematical quantity as modern (MKS and subsequently the SI) electric charge and is not measured in coulombs.

The idea subsequently developed that it would be better, in situations of spherical geometry, to include a factor 4π in equations like Coulomb's law, and write it in the form:

This idea is called "rationalization". The quantities qs′ and ke′ are not the same as those in the older convention. Putting  generates a unit of electricity of different size, but it still has the same dimensions as the cgs esu system.

The next step was to treat the quantity representing "amount of electricity" as a fundamental quantity in its own right, denoted by the symbol q, and to write Coulomb's Law in its modern form:

The system of equations thus generated is known as the rationalized meter–kilogram–second (rmks) equation system, or "meter–kilogram–second–ampere (mksa)" equation system. This is the system used to define the SI units. The new quantity q is given the name "rmks electric charge", or (nowadays) just "electric charge". The quantity qs used in the old cgs esu system is related to the new quantity q by:

Determination of a value for ε0
One now adds the requirement that one wants force to be measured in newtons, distance in meters, and charge to be measured in the engineers' practical unit, the coulomb, which is defined as the charge accumulated when a current of 1 ampere flows for one second.  This shows that the parameter ε0 should be allocated the unit C2⋅N−1⋅m−2 (or equivalent units – in practice "farads per meter").

In order to establish the numerical value of ε0, one makes use of the fact that if one uses the rationalized forms of Coulomb's law and Ampère's force law (and other ideas) to develop Maxwell's equations, then the relationship stated above is found to exist between ε0, μ0 and c0. In principle, one has a choice of deciding whether to make the coulomb or the ampere the fundamental unit of electricity and magnetism.  The decision was taken internationally to use the ampere.  This means that the value of ε0 is determined by the values of c0 and μ0, as stated above. For a brief explanation of how the value of μ0 is decided, see Vacuum permeability.

Permittivity of real media
By convention, the electric constant ε0 appears in the relationship that defines the electric displacement field D in terms of the electric field E and classical electrical polarization density P of the medium.  In general, this relationship has the form:

 

For a linear dielectric, P is assumed to be proportional to E, but a delayed response is permitted and a spatially non-local response, so one has:

 

In the event that nonlocality and delay of response are not important, the result is:

where ε is the permittivity and εr the relative static permittivity.

See also
Casimir effect
Coulomb's law
Electromagnetic wave equation
ISO 31-5
Mathematical descriptions of the electromagnetic field
Relative permittivity
Sinusoidal plane-wave solutions of the electromagnetic wave equation
Wave impedance
Vacuum permeability

Notes

Electromagnetism
Fundamental constants